József Sarlós (8 July 1909 – 9 July 1996) was a Hungarian gymnast. He competed in eight events at the 1936 Summer Olympics.

References

1909 births
1996 deaths
Hungarian male artistic gymnasts
Olympic gymnasts of Hungary
Gymnasts at the 1936 Summer Olympics
People from Nové Zámky District
Sportspeople from the Nitra Region